Vairagyam is a 1987 Indian Tamil-language film directed by K. Vijayan and produced by K. Balaji. The film stars Sowcar Janaki, Prabhu and Radha. It was released on 15 August 1987. The film was a remake of Telugu film Anasuyamma Gari Alludu.

Plot

Cast 
 Sowcar Janaki as Annapoorni
 Prabhu as Raja
 Radha as Annapoorni's daughter
 Jaishankar as Annapoorni's husband
 Vinu Chakravarthy as Annapoorni's cousin

Production 
Vairagyam was directed by K. Vijayan and produced by K. Balaji under Sujatha Films. The dialogues were written by Aaroor Dass. Cinematography was handled by G. Or. Nathan, and editing by D. Vasu.

Soundtrack 
The soundtrack was composed by Manoj–Gyan.

Release and reception 
Vairagyam was released on 15 August 1987. N. Krishnaswamy of The Indian Express wrote, "The taming of the shrew portions, true to the tenor of the film, are rude, rough and rumbustious, chockful with hot-air rhetoric against the rich."

References

External links 
 

1980s Tamil-language films
Films directed by K. Vijayan
Films scored by Manoj–Gyan
Tamil remakes of Telugu films